Carlos Riquelme (13 May 1914 – 17 May 1990) was a Mexican film actor. He appeared in 160 films between 1939 and 1989.

Selected filmography
 Adventure in the Night (1948)
 A Family Like Many Others (1949)
 The Absentee (1951)
 Now I Am Rich (1952)
 Rossana (1953)
 The Boy and the Fog (1953)
 The Ghost Falls In Love (1953)
 To the Four Winds (1955)
 A Woman's Devotion (1956)
 Rebel Without a House (1960)
 Under the Volcano (1984)
 The Milagro Beanfield War (1988)

References

External links

1914 births
1990 deaths
Mexican male film actors
20th-century Mexican male actors
Male actors from Mexico City